Pop It may refer to:

"Pop It", a song by Sidney Bechet, 1939
"Pop It", a song by rapper YG (see DJ Mustard production discography) 
"Pop It", a song by Lil Wayne, 2007
Pop it, a fidget toy